The office of Sheriff of Newcastle upon Tyne existed from  until local government reorganisation in , and was reintroduced in  as a title held additionally by the Deputy Lord Mayor of Newcastle upon Tyne. The city has a sheriff because it was historically a county corporate.

In 1950 Violet Grantham became the first woman to hold the office (becoming the first female Lord Mayor two years later), and in 2019 Councillor Habib Rahman became the first BAME person to hold the office.

William Haswell Stephenson, who held the office in 1886, commissioned a bronze statue of Queen Victoria by Alfred Gilbert to celebrate 500 years of the shrievalty; it stands in the city centre and is Grade II* listed.

Sheriffs 1400-1974

Sheriffs 1996-present

References

External links

Sheriff
Sheriff
Newcastle upon Tyne